Newman Outdoor Field is a baseball stadium in Fargo, North Dakota. It is located on the campus of North Dakota State University and is the home of the independent American Association's Fargo-Moorhead RedHawks and the North Dakota State Bison baseball team.

The 4,172 seat facility opened in 1996. In 1998, naming rights were sold to Newman Outdoor Advertising for $1.5 million. Fargo based architect firm R.L. Engebretson P.C. worked on the design with RedHawks GM John Dittrich and Assistant GM Tim Flakoll and City of Fargo leaders.

The stadium contained the Maury Wills Museum in honor of the former Major League Baseball player who worked for the RedHawks as a coach and a radio analyst until the conclusion of the 2017 Season.

The first number retired at the stadium was the #8 worn by hometown hero Roger Maris when he played for the Fargo-Moorhead Twins in the 1950s.  The outfield distances replicate those of Yankee stadium where Maris made history.

In 2012, college baseball writer Eric Sorenson ranked the field the sixth most underrated venue in Division I baseball.

The stadium was of the four hub stadiums used for the six team shortened American Association season in 2020. It was the hub stadium for the RedHawks as well as the Winnipeg Goldeyes.

In 2021, the stadium played host to the second NDSU Baseball team to make it to the 2021 NCAA Division I baseball tournament as the Bison went 14–4 at home that season.

In 2023, the stadium is scheduled to host the 2023 Summit League Baseball Tournament after the NDSU Baseball team won their first Summit League regular season title in program history.

See also
 List of NCAA Division I baseball venues

References

External links
 Newman Outdoor Field – Fargo Moorhead RedHawks
 Maury Wills Museum – Fargo-Moorhead Convention and Visitors Bureau
  - Fargo Forum

Fargo-Moorhead RedHawks
Buildings and structures in Fargo, North Dakota
North Dakota State Bison baseball
Sports venues in North Dakota
College baseball venues in the United States
Minor league baseball venues
Baseball venues in North Dakota
1996 establishments in North Dakota
Sports venues completed in 1996